Southern Vietnam is one of the three geographical regions of Vietnam, the other two being Northern and Central Vietnam. It includes 2 administrative regions, which in turn are divided into 19 First Tier units, of which 17 are provinces and 2 are municipalities. In a sub-context, "Southern Vietnam" may include part of Central Vietnam. Known as Nam Bộ today in Vietnamese, it was historically called as Gia Định (1779–1832), Nam Kỳ (1832–1945), Nam Bộ (1945–48), and Nam Phần (1948–75).

Southern Vietnam (Basse-Cochinchine in French, or Lower Cochinchina), whose principal city is Saigon, is the newest territory of the Vietnamese people in the movement of Nam tiến (Southward expansion). This region was also the first part of Vietnam to be colonized by the French as French Cochinchina. Southern Vietnam region was incorporated into the Kingdom of Funan from 1st century CE until 6th century CE.

Administration

 Municipality (thành phố trực thuộc trung ương)

See also
 Northern, Central and Southern Vietnam 
 Six Provinces of Southern Vietnam
Cochinchina – a historical exonym for South Vietnam

References

External links

Regions of Vietnam